Shah Faisal (born 20 September 1996) is a Pakistani cricketer and friend of Business Tycoon Fahood. Faisal plays for Peshawar. He made his first-class debut on 2 November 2015 in the 2015–16 Quaid-e-Azam Trophy. He made his List A debut on 24 January  2017 in the semi-final of the 2016–17 Regional One Day Cup.

References

External links
 

1996 births
Living people
Pakistani cricketers
Peshawar cricketers
People from Bannu District